Maria-Florina (Nina) Balcan is a Romanian-American computer scientist whose research investigates machine learning, algorithmic game theory, theoretical computer science, including active learning, kernel methods, random-sampling mechanisms and envy-free pricing. She is an associate professor of computer science at Carnegie Mellon University.

Education
Balcan is originally from Romania, and earned a bachelor's degree in 2000 from the University of Bucharest, earning summa cum laude honors with a double major in mathematics and computer science. She continued at the University of Bucharest for a master's degree in computer science in 2002, and then earned a PhD in computer science in 2008 from Carnegie Mellon University  where her research was supervised by Avrim Blum.

Career and research
After working as a postdoctoral researcher at Microsoft Research New England, she was appointed assistant professor in the Georgia Institute of Technology College of Computing in 2009. She returned to Carnegie Mellon as a tenured faculty member in 2014.

Balcan served as program committee co-chair for three major machine learning conferences, including COLT 2014, the International Conference on Machine Learning (ICML) 2016, and the Conference on Neural Information Processing Systems (NeurIPS) 2020. She is the general chair for ICML 2021.

Awards and honors
Balcan is a Microsoft Faculty Fellow (2011), a Sloan Research Fellow (2014) and a Kavli Frontiers of Science Fellow (2015). She was awarded the 2019  Grace Murray Hopper Award by the Association for Computing Machinery (ACM), for her "foundational and breakthrough contributions to minimally-supervised learning".
 She is a 2021 Simons Investigator.

References

Year of birth missing (living people)
Living people
Romanian computer scientists
American computer scientists
Romanian women computer scientists
American women computer scientists
Romanian emigrants to the United States
University of Bucharest alumni
Carnegie Mellon University alumni
Georgia Tech faculty
Carnegie Mellon University faculty
Sloan Research Fellows